The Wadi Barada offensive (2016–2017) was a military operation against rebel-held villages in the  Barada River valley by the Syrian Army and allied forces, including pro-government militias and Lebanese Hezbollah between December 2016 and January 2017. The Barada River valley includes the village of Ain al-Fijah which holds a water spring that provides drinking water to towns throughout the Rif Dimashq Governorate.

Background
Syrian rebels affiliated with the Free Syrian Army captured the village of Souq Wadi Barada in February 2012. Engineers and technicians who worked at the water spring remained in place. After the rebel capture of Wadi Barada, government forces imposed a blockade on the villages.

In July 2016, Syrian government forces advanced into the village of Harira in the Barada Valley. In response, the al-Nusra Front executed 14 prisoners of war on 20 July. By 3 August, Syrian government and Hezbollah forces captured Harira. As a retaliation, rebels in Wadi Barada cut the water supply to Damascus.

The offensive

On 23 December 2016, in response to alleged pollution of water spring in Ain al-Fijah with diesel fuel by the rebels, government forces conducted airstrikes and shelling on Wadi Barada. Pro-opposition sources instead claimed that it was Syrian Air Force airstrike that was the cause of Ain al-Fijah spring pollution; this claim was later repeated by the Independent International Commission of Inquiry on the Syrian Arab Republic. On 26 December, following airstrikes, the Army advanced into the valley from its outskirts and cliffs. 10 villages in the area were still held by the rebels. The opposition accused the government forces of targeting Ain al-Fijah and nearby villages with barrel bombs which ostensibly led to severe damage to the spring.

On 1 January 2017, the Syrian Army entered Ayn al-Fijah after civilians were evacuated by the Syrian Arab Red Crescent. Heavy clashes in the town continued on the next day, as local Jabhat Fateh al-Sham defenders attempted to halt the army and Hezbollah's advance.

On 3 January, rebels stated that they would let teams enter and fix the spring as long as the government would honor the ceasefire and lift the siege. The government in return called for the rebels to surrender the water spring and restore the water supply for Damascus. Since the demands of the two sides were irreconcilable, government forces proceeded to launch another attack on the following day. They targeted the rebel-held village of Basimah, capturing several sites around the village, including Basimah Orphanage, which was used as rebel base, while the SAA and Hezbollah ambushed what government sources described as Jabhat Fateh al-Sham fighters crossing from Lebanon into Syria, resulting in some casualties with the rest retreating to Arsal Municipality of the Beqa'a Governorate.

On 6 January, elite forces belonging to the 4th Armoured Division under Maher al-Assad's command arrived in Wadi Barada to aid the government offensive. Soon after, the army reportedly captured all hills overlooking Basimah. Later that day, pro-government media claimed that a ceasefire deal had been reached.

By 8 January, the ceasefire deal had failed, and the government forces resumed their offensive. They reportedly managed to capture the hills northwest of Deir Maqran, most importantly Tal Dahr Al-Masabi. On 10 January, Russian Air Force conducted airstrikes against rebels in the area for the first time, while the Syrian Army also bombarded rebel targets near the villages of Basimah and Deir Maqran. Around 12 January, Ayn al-Fijah, Basimah, and other villages, whereupon these settlements agreed to recognize the government under the stipulations of the ceasefire, which included the granting of free passage for militants to their stronghold of Idlib Governorate. Regardless of the village's agreement, several rebels continued to resist and attempted to keep control of the settlements. By then, about 50,000 residents of the valley had been displaced due to the fighting.

On 13 January, Basimah was captured by pro-government forces, whereupon they reportedly also advanced into Ain al-Khadra. According to opposition sources, rebel forces managed to retake Ain al-Khadra soon after. Later that day, Ain al-Fijah, Kafr al-Awamid, Souq Wadi Barada, Dayr Qanoo, Dayr Miqrin and Kafr az Zayt signed a reconciliation agreement with the government, allowing technicians to fix the water springs and to raise the government flag over the towns. Despite this, the new deal applied only to the aforementioned towns, not the whole valley, so that several rebel units continued fighting. As result, some opposition fighters reportedly attacked the technical crews with rockets.

On late 14 January, maintenance vehicles arrived at the Ain Al-Fijah springs, along with some buses to transport rebels to Idlib Governorate. Later that day, however, a rebel sniper killed the Syrian Army general and chief negotiator Ahmad Ghadban as he was returning to the government lines after the latest round of peace talks in the valley. Though the rebels subsequently claimed to have nothing to do with Ghadban's death, all negotiations were suspended, with the government forces declaring they would resume the offensive. The army consequently launched another assault on Ain al-Khadra in the following night, and captured the village. On the next day, Hezbollah-led forces advanced into the outskirts of Ain Al-Fijah and captured the hill of Ra’s al-Sirah to the town's north, resulting in fierce fighting with rebel fighters. On the other side, the Syrian Army took control of most of Al-Husseiniyah after the local elders agreed to a ceasefire deal with the government. Nevertheless, some parts of the town remained outside government control as some rebels reportedly refused to surrender or leave.

Over the next days Hezbollah and army units slowly but steadily advanced into Ain Al-Fijah. On 19 January, government forces captured the village of Afrah. Later that day, representatives of the local rebels and the government agreed to another ceasefire and to attempt to enforce the peace deal that the involved parties had agreed upon before Ahmad Ghadban's death, though this agreement, too, quickly collapsed, with both sides resuming hostilities. The rebels consequently blamed Hezbollah for the failure of the peace process, saying that the government could not restrain the Lebanese fighters. On 26 January, al-Masdar News reported that another agreement had been reached between the government and the opposition fighters, with 2,600 rebels reportedly surrendering. Accordingly, only about 500 militants were still violently opposing the pro-government takeover of Wadi Barada. Despite this, SOHR reported on the next day that fighting for Ain Al-Fijah continued unabated.

On 28 January, however, the rebels finally retreated from Ain Al-Fijah as "goodwill gesture" for the implementation of the peace agreement of 26 January. The army subsequently took control of the town, and said the remaining opposition forces in the valley would be allowed to leave for Idlib Governorate.

A day later, the Army took full control of Wadi Barada. Maintenance workers were sent by the government to fix the Al-Fijeh Springs thus restoring the water supply to 5 million people who reside in Greater Damascus. Later on, the first buses carrying rebels left for Idlib, while al-Masdar News reported that some Jabhat Fatah al-Sham fighters attacked other opposition groups in Kafr az Zayt due to disagreements over the ceasefire.

Talks for ceasefire and evacuation
On 29 December, Syrian government and opposition delegations agreed on talks to achieve a ceasefire at Wadi Barada. Rebels from both the FSA and Jabhat Fatah al-Sham would be given free passage to the Idlib Governorate in exchange of the rebel surrender of Wadi Barada west of Damascus. If so, al-Zabadani and Madaya would be isolated and could be used by the Syrian government to press for another ceasefire and evacuation.

On 6 January, Hezbollah reportedly proposed a ceasefire but was rejected by Ahrar al-Sham, which claimed that the government had earlier rejected a ceasefire which would allow the repair of a water pumping station according to them damaged by airstrikes. Around 5.5 million people around Damascus had little to no access to running water for two weeks as a result of the conflict. Despite this, an agreement for a truce was reportedly still reached on the same day; according to the new deal maintenance workshops would be granted access to fix the damaged water spring, and local militants would handle over their medium and heavy weaponry and would be enrolled in local committees. Those who refused to have their status settled, would be transported to Idlib.

On 13 January,  Ain al-Fijah, Kafr al-Awamid, Souq Wadi Barada, Dayr Qanoo, Dayr Miqrin and Kafr az Zayt signed a deal with the government under Russian mediation, with SOHR reporting the following contents: (1) Exemption of locals from army service for six months; (2) delivery of most arms to the government; (3) wanted locals are allowed to settle their conditions with government security agencies; (4) no armed presence around the towns is allowed; (5) non-native rebels are sent to Idlib; (6) all rebels who want to voluntarily leave the valley for Idlib are allowed to do so; (7) the military is not allowed to enter the homes of locals; (8) the military can set up checkpoints within the towns, at their entrances, and along the main roads; (9) locals and former rebels are allowed to join the National Defence Forces; (10) expelled employees in the valley can return to their jobs. These negotiations broke down following the death of the Syrian government's chief negotiator. Another attempt to enforce this agreement was made on 19 January, which also quickly broke down. The International Meeting on Syrian Settlement was then held in Astana, Kazakhstan as part of the peace process, where Bashar Jaafari, the U.N. envoy representing the Syrian government, announced that the ceasefire that began in December 2016 did not apply to the Barada region because of a terrorist presence. On 26 January it was reported by pro-government media that over 2,600 militants had laid down their arms, most returning to civilian life or joining self-defense units.

International reactions
: The U.N. Independent International Commission of Inquiry on Syria claimed that it had found no evidence of deliberate contamination of the Wadi Barada water supply or demolition by rebels, and instead accused the Syrian Air Force of having deliberately bombed the water sources in December 2016. The commission said that "the attack amounts to the war crime of attacking objects indispensable for the survival of the civilian population, and further violated the principle of proportionality in attacks". Jan Egeland, head of the Norwegian Refugee Council in Geneva, stated that "To sabotage and deny water is of course a war crime, because it is civilians who drink it and civilians who will be affected by waterborne diseases if supplies are not restored".

References

Conflicts in 2016
Conflicts in 2017
Military operations of the Syrian civil war in 2016
Rif Dimashq Governorate in the Syrian civil war
Military operations of the Syrian civil war involving Hezbollah
Military operations of the Syrian civil war involving Jabhat Fateh al-Sham
Military operations of the Syrian civil war in 2017
December 2016 events in Syria
January 2017 events in Syria
Military operations of the Syrian civil war involving the Syrian government